William O. Newashe (October 5, 1889 – February 8, 1962) was a professional football player. He attended high school and college at the Carlisle Indian School, located in Carlisle, Pennsylvania. Newashe, a member of the Sac and Fox Nation, played five games in the National Football League during the 1923 season with the Oorang Indians.

He was married to Myrtle Cowan.  They had a daughter, Suzanne Newashe Underwood, who was the mother to Rebecca Lea Lewis Dean.

He had a sister, Emma Newashe, who was the grandmother to Donna Newashe McAllister. Bill was a Native American and a member of the Sac and Fox nation. Newashe also played basketball and baseball at Carlisle participated in track, competing in the hammer throw. Newahse played for the Harrisburg baseball team as a pitcher and later for the Jackson, Michigan baseball team. He was a teammate of Jim Thorpe at Carlisle. He served as a pall bearer at Thorpe's death

Notes

1899 births
1962 deaths
American football tackles
Native American players of American football
Oorang Indians players
Carlisle Indians football players
Players of American football from Oklahoma
Sportspeople from Shawnee, Oklahoma
Sac and Fox people
20th-century Native Americans